was a high-ranking samurai in Japan during the Edo period. He was a karō in the Yonezawa Domain under the Uesugi clan. Although he died prior to the events of the Forty-seven rōnin, he appears in fictional accounts, including the 1971 Daichūshingura starring Toshirō Mifune. He also appears in the 1999 NHK Taiga drama Genroku Ryōran.

The Meiji period politician-businessman Chisaka Takamasa was a descendant of Takafusa.

Sources
This article incorporates material in 千坂高房 (Chisaka Takafusa) in the Japanese Wikipedia, retrieved on February 28, 2008.

1638 births
1700 deaths
Karō
Uesugi retainers